(), also referred as , , , is a form of , a traditional Chinese upper garment, with broad sleeves in . It was most popular during the Tang dynasty, particularly among the members of royalty. The  was mainly worn for special ceremonial occasions and had different variations, mainly the result of different collar formations (e.g., parallel or cross collar or those with no collar). The  could be worn under a skirt or as an outerwear. After the Tang dynasty, it continued to be worn in the Song and Ming dynasties.

Terminology 
It has come to be known as  but has also been called  at various times.

History

Tang dynasty and Five dynasties and Ten Kingdoms 

It was not until the mid-late Tang dynasty period that the distinctions between royal women's clothing and other styles became increasingly obvious. The width of sleeves worn by common women often exceeded 4 feet in the mid-late Tang dynasty.

Song dynasty 
The  was originally worn by empresses and imperials concubines as their ordinary clothing. However, it was later adopted by the aristocratic women who used it as part of their ceremonial attire.

Ming dynasty 

Construction and Design

Tang dynasty  
The width of the coat increased to more than four feet and its sleeves were often wider than 1.3 metres. It features a distinctive gown that covers the body from the ground to just above the chest with a knot wrapped around the waist, a light and sometimes sheer outer coat that ties together at the bottom, near the knees, and often goes along with a long scarf draped around the arms. The clothing often only covers half of women's breast and so it is restricted to women of a certain status, such as princesses or gējī.

Derivative and influences

Korea 
The Ming dynasty bestowed official clothing to the Joseon's queens but not the wife of the Crown prince, as such the clothing sent by the Ming dynasty to the Joseon queens in early Joseon became the prototypes for the robes of crown princess of Joseon. After the fall of the Ming dynasty,  continued to be worn in Joseon by the queens and crown princesses for special occasions, such as the weddings, and ceremonial occasions. Since the reign of King Yeonjo, the jeogui became the Joseon's queen royal ceremonial clothing instead and the  appears to have ceased being worn.

Similar garments 

 Beizi

See also
Hanfu
List of Hanfu
Banbi
Bijia

References

Chinese traditional clothing